
Gmina Kocierzew Południowy is a rural gmina (administrative district) in Łowicz County, Łódź Voivodeship, in central Poland. Its seat is the village of Kocierzew Południowy ("South Kocierzew").

Villages
Gmina Kocierzew Południowy contains the villages and settlements of Boczki, Gągolin Północny, Gągolin Południowy, Gągolin Zachodni, Jeziorko, Kocierzew Północny, Kocierzew Południowy, Konstantynów, Łaguszew, Lenartów, Lipnice, Osiek, Ostrowiec, Płaskocin, Różyce, Różyce-Żurawieniec, Sromów, Wejsce and Wicie.

Neighbouring gminas
Gmina Kocierzew Południowy is bordered by the gminas of Chąśno, Iłów, Kiernozia, Łowicz, Nieborów, Nowa Sucha and Rybno.

References
Polish official population figures 2006

Kocierzew Poludniowy
Łowicz County